The 2011 Wyldecrest Park Homes Welsh Open was a professional ranking snooker tournament that took place between 14 and 20 February 2011 at the Newport Centre in Newport, Wales. This was the first time that the Welsh Open was sponsored by Wyldecrest Park Homes.

Stephen Hendry made the 77th official maximum break during his second round match against Stephen Maguire. This was Hendry's 10th 147 break and with this equalled the record for most maximums with Ronnie O'Sullivan, and became the oldest player to compile a maximum break at the age of 42 years and 35 days.

John Higgins defended his title, which he won in 2010, after defeating Maguire 9–6 in the final. This was the first All-Scottish final since the 2005 Malta Cup final between Hendry and Graeme Dott.

Prize fund
The breakdown of prize money for this year is shown below: 

Winner: £30,000
Runner-Up: £15,000
Semi-final: £7,500
Quarter-final: £5,600
Last 16: £4,000
Last 32: £2,500
Last 48: £1,600
Last 64: £1,250

Stage one highest break: £500
Stage two highest break: £1,000
Total: £201,500

Main draw

Final

Qualifying
These matches took place between 8 and 11 February 2011 at the World Snooker Academy, Sheffield, England.

Century breaks

Qualifying stage centuries

 143  Barry Hawkins
 137  James McBain
 137  Patrick Wallace
 128  Anthony Hamilton
 125  Ian McCulloch
 124  David Gilbert
 124, 101, 100  Jack Lisowski
 124  Xiao Guodong
 119  Jamie Jones

 111  Joe Jogia
 110  Jimmy Robertson
 107, 103  Jimmy White
 105  Kuldesh Johal
 103  Anthony McGill
 103  Dominic Dale
 102  Joe Perry
 100  Jamie Burnett

Televised stage centuries
 

 147  Stephen Hendry
 139  Dominic Dale
 137, 129, 109, 105  Stephen Maguire
 136, 132, 120  John Higgins
 133  Matthew Stevens
 130  Neil Robertson
 125, 113, 109, 102  Ryan Day
 125, 103  Ding Junhui

 120, 108, 100  Mark Williams
 120  Jamie Cope
 118  Ali Carter
 115  Peter Ebdon
 102  Nigel Bond
 102  Mark Selby
 100  Ronnie O'Sullivan

References

External links

2011
Welsh Open
Open (snooker)
Welsh Open snooker in Newport